Thrissur is the Cultural Capital of the Indian state of Kerala.

Thrissur may also refer to:

Thrissur Pooram, called "the Pooram of all Poorams" and the biggest of all Poorams held in Kerala state
Thrissur Metropolitan Area, the third largest urban agglomeration in Kerala
Thrissur district, a central Kerala district
Thrissur Lok Sabha constituency, one of the 20 Lok Sabha constituency in Kerala
Thrissur C. Rajendran, a noted Carnatic Violinist from Kerala
Thrissur Motor Show, the only motor show in Kerala state
Thrissur Urban Development Authority, an urban development authority for Thrissur Metropolitan Area.